Nooken District (before 1992: Lenin District) is a district of Jalal-Abad Region in western Kyrgyzstan. The administrative seat lies at Masy.

Population

Towns, rural communities and villages
In total, Nooken District includes 1 town and 54 settlements in 8 rural communities. Each rural community can consist of one or several villages. The rural communities and settlements in the Nooken District are:

 town Kochkor-Ata
 Aral (seat: Aral; incl. Internatsional, Rassvet, Chertak-Tash and Cheremushki)
 Bürgöndü (seat: Bürgöndü; incl. Jangy-Aryk, Jengish, Kichi-Bürgöndü, Kokonduk, Kurama, Kyzyl-Kyya, Nooshken and Uuru-Jar)
 Dostuk (seat: Shamaldy-Say; incl. Dostuk, Kuduk, Kyzyl-Tuu, Sary-Kamysh and Shyng-Say)
 Masy (seat: Masy; incl. Apyrtan, Besh-Jygach, Bögöt and Kyzyl-Tuu)
 Mombekov (seat: Mombekov; incl. Boston, Jazgak, Jangy-Kyshtak, Kök-Tash, Kochkor-Ata, Kurulush and Chek)
 Nooken (seat: Komintern; incl. Kara-Bulak, Kirov, Kurulush, Kyzyl-Jyldyz, Parakanda and Rakhmanjan)
 Sakaldy (seat: Sakaldy; incl. Arimjan, Böbüy, Kagazdy, Kyzyl-Kyrgyzstan, Chek and Chong-Bagysh)
 Shaydan (seat: Alma; incl. Birdik, Jangy-Aryk, Jon-Aryk, Kök-Ajdar, Toskool and Eski-Masy)

References 

Districts of Jalal-Abad Region